Consort Meng Arrives, officially known as Mengfei Comes Across, is a 2018 Chinese television starring Gina Jin and Jiro Wang. The series is based on the eponymous novel Meng Fei Jia Dao (萌妃驾到) by Lian Qiao, and set during the Tang Dynasty. The series was broadcast on Youku from 8 June 2018.

Synopsis
A story revolving around the mischievous Concubine Meng who starts out at odds with the Emperor but falls in love with him in the process; as well as her adventures in the palace.

Cast

Main
 Gina Jin as Bu Meng (萌妃)
 Jiro Wang as Wen Lou

Supporting
 Xia Yiyao as Consort Yan (言妃)
 Han Jiunuo as Qu Wanwan (曲嫔)
 Mi Na as Noble Lady Xiao (骁贵人)
 Liu Guanlin as Liu Jinyan
 Zhang Haiyu as He Qiliao
 Zhou Bin as Bao Qu
 Liu Weisen as Cai Taixian
 Jia Qingru as Noble Consort Ru (如贵妃)
 Chen Dexiu as Bu Yue
 Chen Jiayan as the Empress Dowager
 Tang Mengjia as Yan'er
 Yang Yunqi as Chunping
 Chen Yao as Pu Liji
 Chi Ningning as Chen Yuanxi
 Yu Siyuan as Concubine Zu (足嫔)
 Wu Jingjing as Concubine Wang (王嫔)
 Zhai Lin as Noble Lady Yi (伊贵人)
 Li Jiawen as Xiaobai
 Ma Ding as Noble Lady Xian (嫌贵人)
 Huang Zixi as Su Ruan
 Zhang Hengyu as Lüliu
 Tang Hao as Fuxi
 Qu Aohui as Zhen Shishuang
 Gao Yuqing as Wu Weiyong

Soundtrack

References

2018 Chinese television series debuts
Chinese web series
Television shows based on Chinese novels
Chinese comedy-drama television series
Youku original programming
2018 Chinese television series endings
2018 web series debuts